Amblyseius gliricidii is a species of mite in the family Phytoseiidae.

References

gliricidii
Articles created by Qbugbot
Animals described in 1961